Jill Esposito is an American diplomat who was Chargé d’Affaires of the U.S. Embassy in Iceland from 2017 to 2019. Esposito had previously served as “as Consul General at the U.S. Embassy in Baghdad, with responsibility for coordinating consular affairs throughout the three U.S. Posts operating in Iraq.”

References

American women ambassadors
American consuls
Ambassadors of the United States to Iceland
Year of birth missing (living people)
Living people
21st-century American women